XHGNB-FM is a radio station on 94.1 FM in Guerrero Negro, Baja California Sur.

History
XHGNB received its concession on March 23, 1992.

References

Radio stations in Baja California Sur
Radio stations established in 1992